Franz Muncker (4 December 1855, in Bayreuth – 7 September 1926, in Munich) was a German literary historian.

From 1873 he studied Old German and Romance languages and literature under Konrad Hofmann and modern languages and literature with Michael Bernays at the University of Munich, receiving his doctorate in 1878. In 1890 he was appointed successor to Bernays at Munich, where from 1896 to 1926, he served as a full professor of modern German literary history.

Published works 
From 1886 to 1924 he worked on a 23-volume edition of Gotthold Ephraim Lessing's writings and letters; titled Gotthold Ephraim Lessings sämtliche schriften. His biography of Wagner, Richard Wagner : Eine Skizze seines Lebens und Wirkens (1891), was translated into English and published as Richard Wagner; a sketch of his life and works. Muncker's other principal works are the following:
 Joufrois : Altfranzösisches rittergedicht (with Konrad Hofmann, 1880) – "Joufrois", an old French knight poem.
 Johann Kaspar Lavater. Eine Skizze seines Lebens und Wirkens, 1883 – Johann Kaspar Lavater, a sketch of his life and works.
 Friedrich Gottlieb Klopstock. Geschichte seines Lebens und seiner Schriften, 1888 – Friedrich Gottlieb Klopstock, history of his life and writings.
 Friedrich Rückert, 1890 – On Friedrich Rückert.
He was also the author of numerous biographies in the Allgemeine Deutsche Biographie, and wrote the introductions to the following literary collections:
 H. von Kleists sämtliche werke (4 volumes, 1882–83) – The works of Heinrich von Kleist.
 Klopstocks gesammelte Werke (4 volumes, 1887–90) – Friedrich Gottlieb Klopstock's collected works.
 Wielands gesammelte werke (6 volumes, 1888–89) – Christoph Martin Wieland's collected works.
 Briefwechsel zwischen Schiller und Goethe (4 volumes, 1892) – Correspondence between Schiller and Goethe.
 Immermanns ausgewählte Werke, (6 volumes, 1893) – Karl Leberecht Immermann's selected works.

References 

1855 births
1926 deaths
People from Bayreuth
Ludwig Maximilian University of Munich alumni
Academic staff of the Ludwig Maximilian University of Munich
German literary historians